Oberkreuzberg is a village in the municipality of Spiegelau in the Lower Bavarian district of Freyung-Grafenau in Germany. Until 1978 it was an independent municipality .

Lage 

The parish village (Pfarrdorf) lies at a height of 780 metres about 2 kilometres southwest of Spiegelau on the southern side of a mountain ridge up to 790 metres high with good views.

Literature 
 Ulrich Pietrusky, Donatus Moosauer: Der Bayerische Wald – im Fluge neu entdeckt, Verlag Morsak, Grafenau, 1985, 
 Helmut Döringer: Vor 25 Jahren wurde Oberkreuzberg zu einem Teil der Gemeinde Spiegelau

References 

Freyung-Grafenau
1395 establishments